Agyneta ramosa is a species of sheet weaver found in the Palearctic. It was described by Jackson in 1912.

References

ramosa
Spiders of Europe
Palearctic spiders
Spiders described in 1912